Caviezel is a surname. Notable people with the surname include:
 Gino Caviezel (born 1992), Swiss alpine skier
 Gion Caviezel, Swiss bobsledder
 Jim Caviezel (born 1968), American film actor
 Mauro Caviezel (born 1988), Swiss alpine skier

See also
Caviezel v. Great Neck Public Schools, a 2012 vaccine law case

Rhaeto-Romance surnames